ASTREA is an acronym for Aerial Support To Regional Enforcement Agencies, the air support unit of the San Diego County Sheriff's Department.  ASTREA Base is located at Gillespie Field Airport  in El Cajon, California.

History 
1972 - ASTREA began operations with three Korean War-era Bell 47G helicopters based at Gillespie Field in El Cajon.

1997 - On February 16, Deputy Patrick "Pat" S. Coyle, 42, died after the ASTREA helicopter in which he and pilot Ron Hobson were flying crashed in Sycamore Canyon, northeast of Santee, California. His death marked the first fatality in the then 25-year history of the sheriff's air support unit.

2003 - Cedar Fire and Paradise Fire

2005 - ASTREA receives two refurbished Bell 205A-1++ "Super Huey" firefighting helicopters. These are the first two aircraft purchased for the new regional fire helicopter program the county started after the October 2003 wildfires. Both are single-engine, medium-lift copters equipped with 375 gallon underbelly water tanks. The helicopters arrived at Gillespie Field after a three-day, 2,000-mile flight from Eagle Copters of Calgary, Canada. They are designated Copter 10 and 12.

2008 - A new Bell 407 is acquired and equipped to support law enforcement and command and control missions.

2009 - ASTREA sells two of its Hughes 500Ds. (ASTREA 2 & 4) These will eventually be replaced with MD530Fs.

2010 - The only MD500E owned by ASTREA is converted to an MD530F, which is better suited for high altitude and hot weather operations.

2015 - ASTREA adds a Bell 407GX to the fleet (N972PC). On September 29, ASTREA receives a third Bell 205A-1. Like the first two, Copter 11 was rebuilt by Eagle Copters and flown from Calgary to El Cajon.

Aircraft 
As of January 2021, ASTREA's fleet consists of 8 helicopters:

The 407 models can be equipped with a Bambi bucket for use in firefighting, while the Bell 205s have 375 gallon belly tanks already installed.

References 
 Goldin, J. (2003).  San Diego move aerial support teams into one home.  Air Beat Magazine.  Retrieved April 9, 2004 from https://web.archive.org/web/20040618125310/http://alea.org/public/airbeat/back_issues/jan_feb_2003/sdso.htm .
 Gross, G. (March 24, 2004). Joint-use plan for helicopters still sought.  San Diego Union-Tribune. Retrieved April 14, 2004 from http://www.signonsandiego.com/news/fires/20040327-9999-news_7m27helo.html .
 Moreland, J. (August 3, 2000).  Sheriff has new helicopter, robot for rescues, crime-fighting.  North County Times.  Retrieved April 9, 2004 from http://www.nctimes.com/articles/2000/08/04/export14261.txt .
 Moreland, J. (August 15, 2002). Sheriff dedicates new emergency center.  North County Times. Retrieved April 14, 2004 from http://www.nctimes.com/articles/2002/08/16/export16249.txt .

External links 
 San Diego County Sheriff's Department Official Website
 Airborne Law Enforcement Association (ALEA)
ALEA Unit Photographs - San Diego County Sheriff's Department - photographs of ASTREA
 County of San Diego Official Website

Government of San Diego County, California
Sheriffs' departments of California